Waverley, or Siberia, is a ghost town located between Kalgoorlie and Leonora. It is on the Davyhurst to Ora Banda Road in the Goldfields-Esperance region of Western Australia and has formed part of Maduwongga territory.

Two prospectors Billy Frost and Bob Bonner discovered gold in the area in the late 1893, resulting in a gold rush to the area. The increasing population indicated a need for a townsite to be planned and lots were surveyed in 1898, which was initially to be named Siberia. The local progress association decided that the town should be named Waverley after a nearby mine. The townsite was gazetted as Waverley in 1898.

Some of the mines close to town include Siberia, Waverley, Mexico and the Pole leases.

In 1911 the Postmaster General raised concern about the duplication of town names in Australia, including Waverley. Alternative names such as Wongi (the name of a nearby soak) and Siberia. The locals preferred Siberia and the name was officially gazetted in 1914. The name comes from Siberia Tank, a water supply that is close to the town.

In 1924, two miners, Emery and MacLachlan, picked up on the continuation of a deep alluvial lead and obtained satisfactory results.

The last resident left town in 1954.

References

Ghost towns in Western Australia
Goldfields-Esperance